The Two Little Bears is a 1961 American comedy film directed in CinemaScope by Randall Hood, written by George W. George, and starring Eddie Albert, Jane Wyatt, Soupy Sales, Butch Patrick, Donnie Carter and Jimmy Boyd. The film was released on November 1, 1961, by 20th Century Fox.

The film was known as The Teddy Bears.

The film was the directorial debut of Randy Hood who was assistant to Maury Dexter, head of Robert L. Lippert's production company.

Plot
Harry Davis, principal of the Burberry Elementary School, is concerned because his two little boys wish they were bears. One day, the two boys meet an old gypsy who tells them to use a magic cream and teaches them a spell to turn themselves into bears. When they find their sister's strange freckle cream, they do become bears. Unfortunately, when they turn back into boys, no one will believe their story.

Cast 
Eddie Albert as Harry Davis
Jane Wyatt as Anne Davis
Soupy Sales as Officer McGovern
Butch Patrick as Billy Davis
Donnie Carter as Timmy Davis
Jimmy Boyd as Johnny Dillion
Nancy Kulp as Emily Wilkins
Theodore Marcuse as Janos 
Milton Parsons as Dr. Fredricks
James Maloney as Jefferson Stander
Emory Parnell as Grimshaw Wilkins
Jack Finch as Psychiatrist
Opal Euard as Fortuneteller
Jack Lester as Phil Wade
Richard Alden as Tom Provost
Charlene Brooks as Mary Jerdens
Brenda Lee as Tina Davis

Production
Filming took place in May 1961.

Robert L. Lippert announced plans for a sequel but it appears to not have been made.

Brenda Lee sang two songs in the film, "Honey Bear" over the opening titles and "Speak To Me Pretty", which was a hit when it was released on a single. However, for some reason, "Honey Bear" was not released on disc at the time and remains unreleased to this day. The film was not released in the UK until late 1962, when it went out on release as the lower half of a double-bill with Five Weeks in a Balloon.

References

External links 
 

1961 films
20th Century Fox films
American comedy films
1961 comedy films
1960s English-language films
1960s American films